Them Not Me is an EP by the German thrash metal band Destruction. The period without original vocalist Marcel "Schmier" Schirmer is often called "Neo-Destruction". They released three albums with Thomas Rosenmerkel on vocals: Destruction, Them Not Me and The Least Successful Human Cannonball, although the band does not consider these albums part of their official discography.

Reception 
The EP was given poor reviews on many heavy metal websites. Many reviewers mentioned that the production quality of the EP was far superior to its musical quality. The final track, "Mentally Handicapped Enterprise", was reviewed as the best song of the EP. Many reviewers saw this album as the lowest point in the career of Destruction.

Track listing

Personnel 
Thomas Rosenmerkel – vocals
Michael Piranio – lead guitar
Mike Sifringer – rhythm guitar
Christian Engler – bass
Olly Kaiser – drums

References 

Destruction (band) albums
1995 EPs
Thrash metal EPs
Groove metal EPs